Abstract Emotions is the eighth studio album by American jazz and R&B singer Randy Crawford. It reached No. 178 on the US albums chart, No. 53 in the US R&B chart and No. 14 in the UK Albums Chart. On October 14, 2013 it was issued on CD together with the Nightline album.

Track listing
Side one
"Can’t Stand the Pain" (Dean Gant, Mark Winkler) – 6:02
"Actual Emotional Love" (Billie Hughes, Roxanne Seeman) – 5:05
"World of Fools" (Rolf Graf, Alix Zandrs) – 5:00
"Betcha" (Reggie Lucas, Leslie L. Smith) - 4:31
"Higher Than Anyone Can Count" (Mary Unobsky, Daniel Ironstone) - 4:14

Side two
"Desire" (Reggie Lucas) – 5:25
"Getting’ Away With Murder" (Sue Shifrin, Terry Britten) – 4:02
"Overnight" (Reggie Lucas) – 5:14
"Almaz" (Randy Crawford) – 4:04
"Don’t Wanna be Normal" (Patrick Leonard, Hawk Wolinski, James Newton Howard, David Pack, Michael McDonald) – 5:20

Personnel
Sir Gant, Ed Walsh, Fred Zarr, Harry Whittaker - keyboards, synthesizer
Reggie Lucas - guitar, Synclavier II, octave-plateau sequencer programming
Bashiri Johnson, Leslie Ming - percussion
Anthony Jackson - electric bass guitar
Norma Jean Wright, Brenda Wright King, Lisa Fischer, Yvonne Lewis, Curtis King - backing vocals
Sir Gant, Ed Walsh - synthesizer programming

Production
Produced by: Reggie Lucas, Hawk Wolinski & James Newton Howard
Engineer: Joe Ferla
Additional Engineering: Jim “Doc” Dougherty, Jay Mark & Alan Silverman
Recorded and Mixed at: Quantum Sound Studios, New Jersey
Additional Recording: Giant Sound Studios & Sigma Sound Studios, New York City
DMM Direct Digital Mastering Assistant Engineers: Jimmy Santos, Glenn Rosenstein, Jeff Cox & Craig Johnson

References

1986 albums
Warner Records albums
Randy Crawford albums